Kalifa Manneh (born 2 September 1998) is a Gambian professional footballer who plays as a winger for the Italian  club Perugia.

Club career
At the age of 15, Manneh escaped Gambia in a boat and landed in Sicily as a refugee. That year, he auditioned for Catania and joined their youth academy. Manneh made his professional debut with Catania in a 0-0 Serie C tie with Juve Stabia on 14 May 2017.

On 3 January 2020, Carrarese terminated the loan agreement with Catania.

On 15 July 2021, he signed a three-year contract with Perugia. On 31 January 2022, Manneh was loaned to Taranto.

International career
Manneh debuted for the Gambia national football team in a friendly 1-0 win over Guinea on 7 June 2019.

References

External links
 
 
 

1998 births
Living people
People from Serekunda
Gambian footballers
The Gambia international footballers
Catania S.S.D. players
Carrarese Calcio players
A.C. Perugia Calcio players
Taranto F.C. 1927 players
Serie C players
Serie B players
Association football wingers
Gambian expatriate footballers
Expatriate footballers in Italy